National Breast Cancer Foundation may refer to:

National Breast Cancer Foundation (Australia)
National Breast Cancer Foundation (United States)